Gautam Bora is an Indian Politician from the state of Assam. He was a four term member of the Assam Legislative Assembly and a Minister in the Hiteshwar Saikia Government and later serving under Tarun Gogoi Government. He is a former Indian film director and actor.

Political Party
Bora was a member of Indian National Congress since the time of his entry into politics. He stayed loyal to the party in both good and bad times, even during the mass erosion of INC leaders into the saffron party in 2015.

However he resigned from the membership of INC on 20 March 2021 on the grounds of lobby-centred politics and lack of leadership in the party.

Currently Bora is a member of Bharatiya Janata Party. He joined the BJP on 22 March 2021.

Posts held
Education Minister of Assam from 2011 to 2016.
Cultural Affairs Minister.
Forest Minister
Health Minister

References 

Living people
Indian National Congress politicians
Assam MLAs 2006–2011
Year of birth missing (living people)